The , branded "EXE/EXEα" ("Excellent Express/Excellent Express Alpha"), is an electric multiple unit (EMU) train type operated by the private railway operator Odakyu Electric Railway in Japan on Odakyu Odawara Line and Odakyu Enoshima Line "Romancecar" services since 1996.

Design
Seven 4+6-car trainsets (70 vehicles) were built between 1996 and 1999 to replace ageing Odakyu 3100 series NSE trains. Unlike earlier Romancecar trainsets, which used articulated carriages, the 30000 series sets have 20 m long bogie cars. The inner driving cabs of the 4+6-car formations have gangway doors.

Operations

Formations
, the fleet consists of seven 4+6-car trainsets, formed as follows, with car 1 at the western end. All seven sets are based at Ebina Depot.

Unrefurbished sets

Cars 2, 3, 5, 8, and 9 are each fitted with a single-arm pantograph.
Only one bogie on car 9 is motored.

Refurbished sets
Refurbished trainsets are formed as follows, with five motored cars per ten-car formation.

Cars 2, 3, 5, 8, and 9 are each fitted with a PT7113-A single-arm pantograph.

Interior
The first eight half-sets delivered had green-coloured seats in the six-cars sets (evoking the forests of Hakone) and blue-coloured seats in the four-car sets (evoking the sea of Enoshima), but from 1999 onward, the seats in all sets was standardized with grey and brown seat covers. Wheelchair spaces are located in cars 5 and 8.

Refreshment counters are provided in cars 3 and 9. Toilets are provided in cars 2, 5, and 8, and the toilet in car 5 is a universal access type.

History
The first trains entered revenue service on 23 March 1996.

Build history
The fleet was built between 1996 and 1999 in three batches as follows.

Refurbishment

The fleet underwent a programme of refurbishment from fiscal 2016, with the first 4+6-car trainset treated returning to service in March 2017, rebranded "EXEα".

Refurbishment was carried out by Nippon Sharyo, with the design overseen by Noriaki Okabe Architecture Network. It includes the following changes:
 Redesigned interiors and seating
 Replacement of Japanese-style squat toilets with Western-style toilets (Toto "Washlet" type)
 Additional luggage racks
 LED lighting in passenger saloons
 Installation of security cameras in vestibule and passenger saloons
 Fully enclosed traction motors
 Conversion of one former trailer car (car 3) to a motored car, and the addition of a second motored bogie to car 9, which previously only had one motored bogie.

The first train set to be refurbished, four-car set 30051, was returned to Odakyu from the Nippon Sharyo factory in Toyokawa, Aichi, in November 2016.

In popular culture
The Odakyu 30000 series EXE is featured as a non-driveable train in the Microsoft Train Simulator computer game.

References

External links

 "Romancecar lineup"

Electric multiple units of Japan
30000 series EXE
Kawasaki multiple units
Train-related introductions in 1996
1500 V DC multiple units of Japan
Nippon Sharyo multiple units